Ralph Fabri (April 23, 1894 – February 12, 1975) was an American painter. His work was part of the painting event in the art competition at the 1936 Summer Olympics.

References

1894 births
1975 deaths
20th-century American painters
American male painters
Olympic competitors in art competitions
People from Budapest
20th-century American male artists